Calanus is a genus of copepods.
 Calanus (or Kalyana) was an Indian sage who accompanied the conquests of Alexander the Great.
 The RV Calanus is an 18.6-metre oceanographic research vessel operated by the Scottish Association for Marine Science.